Carry On Cleo is a 1964 British historical comedy film, the tenth in the series of 31 Carry On films (1958–1992). Regulars Sid James, Kenneth Williams, Kenneth Connor, Charles Hawtrey, and Jim Dale are present and Connor made his last appearance until his return in Carry On Up the Jungle six years later. Joan Sims returned to the series for the first time since Carry On Regardless three years earlier. Sims would now appear in every Carry On up to Carry On Emmannuelle in 1978, making her the most prolific actress in the series. Jon Pertwee makes the first of his four appearances in the series. The title role is played by Amanda Barrie in her second and last Carry On. Along with Carry On Sergeant and Carry On Screaming!, its original posters were reproduced by the Royal Mail on stamps to celebrate the 50th anniversary of the Carry On series in June 2008.

Plot

The film opens during Caesar's invasions of Britain, with Mark Antony (Sid James) struggling to lead his armies through miserable weather. At a nearby village, cavemen Horsa (Jim Dale) and Hengist Pod (Kenneth Connor) attempt to alert Boudica to the invasion, but are captured by the Romans.

Once in Rome, Horsa is sold by the slave-trading firm Marcus et Spencius, and Hengist is destined to be thrown to the lions when no-one agrees to buy him. Horsa and Hengist escape and take refuge in the Temple of Vesta. Whilst hiding there, Julius Caesar (Kenneth Williams) arrives to consult the Vestal Virgins, but an attempt is made on his life by his bodyguard, Bilius (David Davenport). In the melee, Horsa kills Bilius and escapes, leaving Hengist to take the credit for saving Caesar's life and to be made Caesar's new bodyguard.

When a power struggle emerges in Egypt, Mark Antony is sent to force Cleopatra (Amanda Barrie) to abdicate in favour of Ptolemy. However, Mark Antony becomes besotted with her, and instead kills Ptolemy off-screen to win her favour. Cleopatra convinces Mark Antony to kill Caesar and become ruler of Rome himself so that they may rule a powerful Roman-Egyptian alliance together. After seducing one another, Mark Antony agrees, and plots to kill Caesar.

Caesar and Hengist travel to Egypt on a galley, along with Agrippa (Francis de Wolff), whom Mark Antony has convinced to kill Caesar. However, Horsa has been re-captured and is now a slave on Caesar's galley. After killing the galley-master (Peter Gilmore), Horsa and the galley slaves kill Agrippa and his fellow assassins and swim to Egypt. Hengist, who had been sent out to fight Agrippa and was unaware of Horsa's presence on board, again takes the credit.

Once at Cleopatra's palace, an Egyptian soothsayer (Jon Pertwee) warns Caesar of the plot to kill him, but Mark Anthony convinces Caesar not to flee. Instead, Caesar convinces Hengist to change places with him, since Cleopatra and Caesar have never met. On meeting, Cleopatra lures Hengist, who accidentally exposes both Cleopatra and Mark Anthony as would-be assassins. He and Caesar then ally with Horsa, and after defeating Cleopatra's bodyguard Sosages (Tom Clegg) in combat, Hengist and the party flee Egypt. Caesar is returned to Rome, only to be assassinated on the Ides of March. Horsa and Hengist return to Britain, and Mark Antony is left in Egypt to live "one long Saturday night" with Cleopatra.

Background notes

The costumes and sets used in the film were originally intended for Cleopatra (1963) before that production moved to Rome and rebuilt new sets there. Carry On Cleo was filmed between 13 July and 28 August 1964.

The original poster and publicity artwork by Tom Chantrell were withdrawn from circulation after 20th Century Fox successfully brought a copyright infringement case against distributor Anglo Amalgamated, which found the design was based on a painting by Howard Terpning for which Fox owned the copyright and was used to promote the Cleopatra film.

Cast

Sid James as Mark Antony
Kenneth Williams as Julius Caesar
Charles Hawtrey as Seneca
Kenneth Connor as Hengist Pod
Joan Sims as Calpurnia
Jim Dale as Horsa
Amanda Barrie as Cleopatra
Victor Maddern as Sergeant Major
Julie Stevens as Gloria
Sheila Hancock as Senna Pod
Jon Pertwee as Soothsayer
Brian Oulton as Brutus
Michael Ward as Archimedes
Francis de Wolff as Agrippa
Tom Clegg as Sosages
Tanya Binning as Virginia
David Davenport as Bilius
Peter Gilmore as Galley master
Ian Wilson as Messenger
Norman Mitchell as Heckler

Brian Rawlinson as Hessian driver
Gertan Klauber as Marcus
Warren Mitchell as Spencius
Michael Nightingale as Caveman
Peter Jesson as Companion
E. V. H. Emmett as Narrator
Judi Johnson as Gloria's bridesmaid (uncredited)
Thelma Taylor as Seneca's servant (uncredited)
Sally Douglas as Antony's dusky maiden (uncredited)
Wanda Ventham as Pretty bidder (uncredited)
Peggy Ann Clifford as Willa Claudia (uncredited)
Mark Hardy as Guard at Caesar's palace (uncredited)
Percy Herbert as Guard (uncredited)
Christine Rodgers as Hand maiden (uncredited)
Gloria Best as Hand maiden (uncredited)
Virginia Tyler as Hand maiden (uncredited)
Gloria Johnson as Vestal Virgin (uncredited)
Joanna Ford as Vestal Virgin (uncredited)
Donna White as Vestal Virgin (uncredited)
Jane Lumb as Vestal Virgin (uncredited)
Vicki Smith as Vestal Virgin (uncredited)

Filming and locations
Filming dates: 13 July – 28 August 1964

Interiors:
 Pinewood Studios, Buckinghamshire
 Chobham Common, Surrey

Reception
The  film premiered at London's Warner cinema on 10 December 1964 and went on to become one of the 12 most popular movies at the British box office in 1965.

Colin McCabe, Professor of English at the University of Exeter, labelled this film (together with Carry On Up The Khyber) as one of the best films of all time.

In 2007, the pun "Infamy, infamy, they've all got it in for me", spoken by Kenneth Williams, was voted the funniest one-line joke in film history. The line was not written by Rothwell but borrowed with permission from a Take It from Here script written by Frank Muir and Denis Norden.

References

Bibliography

Keeping the British End Up: Four Decades of Saucy Cinema by Simon Sheridan (third edition) (2007) (Reynolds & Hearn Books)

External links
 
Carry On Films at The Whippit Inn 

1964 films
1960s historical comedy films
1960s parody films
British historical comedy films
British parody films
Carry On films
Cultural depictions of Calpurnia (wife of Caesar)
Depictions of Cleopatra on film
Depictions of Julius Caesar on film
Depictions of Mark Antony on film
1960s English-language films
Films directed by Gerald Thomas
Films produced by Peter Rogers
Films set in ancient Alexandria
Films set in ancient Egypt
Films set in ancient Rome
Films set in prehistoric Britain
Films set in the 1st century BC
Films shot at Pinewood Studios
Films with screenplays by Talbot Rothwell
1964 comedy films
1960s British films